Governor Trumbull may refer to:

John H. Trumbull (1873–1961), 70th Governor of Connecticut
Jonathan Trumbull (1710–1785), 16th Governor of Connecticut
Jonathan Trumbull Jr. (1740–1809), 20th Governor of Connecticut
Joseph Trumbull (governor) (1782–1861), 35th Governor of Connecticut